Shark in the Park is a New Zealand police procedural. It revolved around the professional and private lives of a group of officers at a Wellington police station under the command of Inspector Brian "Sharky" Finn. The title came from the informal code term used by officers to indicate that the Inspector was about and they should "look busy".

The series ran for three series from 1989–92, totalling 38 episodes. Many of the cast had regular roles in the series and several became well known throughout New Zealand as a result of the series. The show also featured actors in guest roles, among them Lucy Lawless, Michael Hurst, Temuera Morrison and Karl Urban.

The series was produced by the Gibson Group and broadcast by Television One – it has since been repeated on TVNZ 6. Writers for the show included Fran Walsh, later to become well known through her association with Peter Jackson and her work on films such as the Lord of the Rings films.

Cast and characters

Main cast
Jeffrey Thomas as Inspector Brian Finn
K. J. Wilson as Sergeant Ian Jesson
Russell Smith as Detective Bernie Gregory
William Kircher as B.P.
Rima Te Wiata as Jacko (series 1–2)
Joanna Briant as Margaret "Wally" Wallace
Robert Pollock as Dingo (series 1–2)
Geoffrey Heath as Roger Blackman
Grant Tilly as Inspector Englebretsen (series 2–3)
Nathaniel Lees as Barker (series 2–3)
Darren Young as Om (series 2–3)

Recurring cast
John Wraight as Smudge
David Geary as Gerald
Brett Bailey as UB1 (Uniform Branch 1)
Des Stephens as  UB1 (Uniform Branch 1)
Jon Pheloung as Nifty

Guest cast
Neil Gudsell as Constable Ra (series 1)
Jenny Ludlam as Diane (series 1) / Josie Tucker (series 2)
Mark Wright as Tony (series 1)
Robyn Malcolm as Janice (series 1) / Janet Finn (series 2–3)
Alan Brough (series 1)
Ken Blackburn as Superintendent (series 2–3)

Episodes

Series 1 (1989)

Series 2 (1990)

Series 3 (1991)

References

External links

Shark in the Park
The Gibson Group
Nga Taonga Sound & Vision

1980s New Zealand television series
1990s New Zealand television series
1989 New Zealand television series debuts
1991 New Zealand television series endings
New Zealand drama television series
Police procedural television series
Television shows funded by NZ on Air
Television shows set in Wellington
TVNZ 1 original programming